J Boy is a singer and songwriter from Mount Isa, Australia. He is a former member of Native Ryme Syndicate and released his solo debut CD in 2002. J Boy won a Deadly in 2001 for  Most Promising New Talent .

Discography
 Waited ep (2002) - Kalakuta Records

Guest appearances

References

Indigenous Australian musicians
Australian male singers
People from Mount Isa
Living people
Year of birth missing (living people)